WWPG (104.3 FM) is a radio station licensed to serve Eutaw, Alabama, United States.  The station is owned by Jim Lawson Communications, Inc. First licensed to broadcast in 1992, WWPG-FM currently airs an urban adult contemporary music format.

History
The Federal Communications Commission granted the original construction permit for this radio station on August 18, 1988. This new station was assigned call letters WIDO on September 27, 1988. The station's license to cover was granted on May 5, 1992.

In August 1992, Grantell Broadcasting Company reached an agreement to sell then-WIDO to Jim Lawson Communications, Inc.  The FCC approved the deal on October 23, 1992, and the transaction was consummated on April 2, 1993. The new owners had the station's callsign changed to WQLQ on May 18, 1983. This callsign lasted until another change, this time to WWQZ, on January 13, 1997, which was followed rapidly by another change on March 1, 1997, to WQZZ.  The callsign again changed, this time to the current WWPG, on May 18, 2010.

References

External links

WPG
Radio stations established in 1992
1992 establishments in Alabama
Urban adult contemporary radio stations in the United States
Greene County, Alabama